IVBSS, Integrated Vehicle-Based Safety Systems program, is a study led by Ann Arbor from University of Michigan Transportation Research Institute to test integrated crash avoidance system and access its efficiency in 2007–2011. 16 passenger cars and 10 trucks equipped with the system, which warned against front crash risks, lateral crash risks, risks involved while moving between lanes and curve risks while turning, participated in the study. Driver behaviour was recorded with and without the system.

IVBSS involved contract with the American power management company Eaton Corporation who provided radar-based technology and worked on its integration with the existing parts of the system.

In November 2005 — April 2008, the first phrase of the study was conducted, developing systems specification, design, and construction of prototype vehicles. In April 2008, the program was approved for the second phase — field tests. The field tests continued during February to December 2009. Con-way Freight sponsored and participated in the heavy trucks part of the field tests.

The IVBSS won the Best of ITS Awards US national competition in 2008.

The results indicated that drivers were ready to start using the system, with 72% of drivers indicating that they would like to have such systems in their personal vehicles, and found its blind spot component particularly relevant.

References

External links 
 IVBSS official website

Transport safety